Ángela is a Mexican telenovela produced by José Alberto Castro for Televisa that premiered on November 30, 1998 and ended on March 19, 1999.

The series stars Angélica Rivera, Juan Soler, Ignacio López Tarso and Jacqueline Andere.

Plot
Angela is a charming and beautiful young school teacher, with a sweet but firm character. Her only living relative is her mother Delia, a sick and embittered woman. On her deathbed, Delia makes Angela swear an oath that she will rise to the top in life, and with her last breath she curses Emilia Santillana, the woman who stole Angela's father away from her.

Upon hearing at last the name that Delia had always refused to reveal, Angela vows, with chilling determination, that she will not rest until she has found this woman, Emilia Santillana, and made her pay for ruining her mother's life. Emilia Santillana lives in the city of San Miguel de Allende, where she runs a very successful silver mine, "La Soledad". In addition to the mine, Emilia Santillana owns a factory.

One day, Angela arrives at Emilia's company seeking employment. Yolanda Rivas, Emilia's right hand, takes pity on the seemingly sweet and shy young girl and persuades her boss to hire her. Little by little Angela wins her trust. Angela is convinced of her righteousness and uses her beauty and her growing influence within the business to systematically destroy Emilia's world.

Only one person mistrusts her and is not seduced by her apparent innocence. Mariano Bautista, a young engineer who works in a silver mine. Angela tries to ignore her attraction for Mariano, but finally comes to realize that she truly loves him.

And, for the first time in her life, the promise of happiness seems within her reach when Mariano confesses that he too has fallen in love with her. Nevertheless, the oath she swore over her mother's grave binds her to her destiny, and Angela is now powerless to stop the tidal wave of destruction and suffering that she herself has unleashed.

Cast
 Angélica Rivera as Ángela Bellati / Ángela Gallardo Bellati
 Juan Soler as Mariano Bautista Solórzano
 Ignacio López Tarso as Don Feliciano Villanueva
 Jacqueline Andere as Emilia Santillana Roldán
 Ana Martín as Delia Bellati Roldán
 Juan Peláez as Humberto Gallardo
 Patricia Navidad as Ximena Chávez
 Joana Benedek as Catalina Lizárraga Miranda
 Aurora Molina as Francisca Osuna
 Ana Bertha Lepe as Lorenza Chávez
 Olivia Bucio as Yolanda Rivas
 José Elías Moreno as Father Martín Villanueva
 Manuel "Flaco" Ibáñez as Don Ramiro
 Ernesto Godoy as Bruno Lizárraga Miranda
 Rosángela Balbó as Esther Miranda Parra de Lizárraga
 Harry Geithner as Julián Arizpe
 Arsenio Campos as Óscar Lizárraga
 Yolanda Ciani as Hortensia Solórzano Mateos de Bautista
 Rossana San Juan as Susana Chávez
 Eduardo Rivera as Emeterio González
 José María Yazpik as René Bautista Solórzano
 Luz María Zetina as Diana Gallardo Santillana
 Gerardo Albarrán as Claudio Sazueta
 Rocío Gallardo as Clara García
 René Casados as Alfonso Molina
 Isaura Espinoza as Norma de Molina 
 Carlos Bracho as Salvador Bautista
 Manuel Benítez as Teniente Ramos
 Lolita Ríos as Guadalupe "Lupita" García
 Natasha Dupeyrón as María Molina
 Andrea Riquelme as Graciela
 Fernanda Reto as Irma Rodríguez
 Vicente Herrera as Reynaldo
 Marina Marín as Principal Guadalupe Armenta
 Roberto Porter as Simón
 Pilar Escalante as Teacher Lola
 Isaac Castro as Luis
 Lourdes Jáuregui as Young Delia Bellati Roldán
 Héctor Parra as Young Humberto Gallardo
 Orlando Miguel as Pedro Solórzano Mateos

Notes
Yadhira Carrillo was originally cast as Angela but replaced by Rivera at the last minute with little explanation causing some cast members to leave the cast in solidarity with Carrillo.  Leading man Juan Soler eventually went to star with Yadhira three years later in the successful soap opera, La Otra.

References

External links

1998 telenovelas
Mexican telenovelas
1998 Mexican television series debuts
1999 Mexican television series endings
Spanish-language telenovelas
Television shows set in Mexico City
Television shows set in Veracruz
Televisa telenovelas